A uniporter  is a membrane transport protein that transports a single species of substrate (charged or uncharged) across a cell membrane. It may use either facilitated diffusion and transport along a diffusion gradient or transport against one with an active transport process. Uniporters include both carriers and ion channels, and are referred to as facilitated transporters, suggesting movement down a concentration or electrochemical gradient.

Uniporter carrier proteins work by binding to one molecule of substrate at a time. Uniporter channels open in response to a stimulus and allow the free flow of specific molecules.

There are several ways in which the opening of uniporter channels may be regulated:

 Voltage – Regulated by the difference in voltage across the membrane
 Stress – Regulated by physical pressure on the transporter (as in the cochlea of the ear)
 Ligand – Regulated by the binding of a ligand to either the intracellular or extracellular side of the cell

Uniporters are found in mitochondria and neurons. The uniporter in the mitochondria is responsible for calcium uptake. The calcium channels are used for cell signaling and triggering apoptosis. The calcium uniporter transports calcium across the inner mitochondrial membrane and is activated when calcium rises above a certain concentration. Voltage-gated potassium channels are also uniporters that can be found in neurons and are essential for action potentials. This channel is activated by a voltage gradient created by sodium-potassium pumps. When the membrane reaches a certain voltage, the channels open which depolarizes the membrane which leads to the action potential being sent down the membrane.

See also
 Antiporter
 Symporter

References 

 Alberts, Bruce et al. — Essential Cell Biology, 1st edition. Garland Publishing, New York: 1998.

Integral membrane proteins
Transport phenomena